Holiday Watchdog was a London-based travel website and review site.

History
The site was established in June 2002 by Chris Brown, who came up with the idea for a review site whilst working at lastminute.com. He taught himself computer programming from a £17 book. He then partnered with Chris Clarkson, who he met in a chat room, to develop the website and its business relationships.

In 2006, the website began soliciting video clips. 

In January 2008, the website was acquired by TripAdvisor after the owners received a "multi-million-pound offer". At that time, the website had 3 million unique visitors per month.

In 2010, the website had turnover of £30 million.

In July 2020, Tripadvisor sold Holiday Watchdog to Hopjump.

References

Tripadvisor
2007 mergers and acquisitions
British companies established in 2003
British review websites
British travel websites
Defunct British websites
Internet properties established in 2003
Transport companies established in 2003